Petros Mavroidis is currently the Political Affairs Director of the Ministry of Foreign Affairs of Greece. He served as Ambassador of Greece to Pakistan from 2007 to 2014.

Background
Mavroidis was born in Pireaus, Greece in 1954. He has a degree in political science from the University of Brussels, and a Masters in International law and European History. He started his diplomatic career in 1981, serving in various posts around the world. He was appointed ambassador to Pakistan in December 2007, presenting his credentials to President Pervez Musharraf. During his tenure in Pakistan, he also served as the spokesperson for the European Union.

References

1954 births
Ambassadors of Greece to Pakistan
Greek diplomats
Living people
People from Piraeus